Acronia is a genus of longhorn beetles of the subfamily Lamiinae, containing the following species:

 Acronia luzonica Schultze, 1934
 Acronia nigra Breuning, 1947
 Acronia perelegans Westwood, 1863
 Acronia pretiosa Schultze, 1917
 Acronia roseolata Breuning, 1947
 Acronia strasseni Schwarzer, 1931
 Acronia vizcayana Vives, 2009
 Acronia ysmaeli Hüdepohl, 1989
 Acronia gloriosa (Schultze, 1922)
 Acronia principalis (Heller, 1924)
 Acronia pulchella (Schultze, 1922)
 Acronia superba (Breuning, 1947)
 Acronia teterevi Barševskis, 2016

References

Pteropliini